Bur Sa'id may refer to:
 Port Said, in Arabic language
 Port Said Governorate